The IRB Chairman's Award was awarded by World Rugby until 2005.

List of winners

Other World Rugby Awards

External links
 World Rugby Awards

References

Chairman